Duncan McCulloch (1893–1968) was one of the leading Scottish-based professional golfers of the inter-war period. He was Scottish Professional Champion in 1929 and 1930.

Early life
McCulloch was born in Troon, Scotland on 31 January 1893 to John McCulloch and his wife Flora nee McMillan.

Golf career
McCulloch was an assistant to George Duncan at Hanger Hill Golf Club, London for three years before World War I. After the war, he returned to Troon and worked as a club-maker at Troon Municipal. In the 1923 Scottish Professional Championship, he had led after the first day and finished tied for third place. McCulloch was appointed the professional at Troon Golf Club in 1924 on the retirement of Willie Fernie. McCulloch remained at Troon until retiring in 1953.

McCulloch won the Scottish Professional Championship in 1929 and 1930. He was also runner-up in 1927 and 1937. He qualified for The Open Championship 11 times between 1923 and 1935. His best finish was at Sandwich in 1928 where he was tied for 18th place. In the 1925 Open at Prestwick, he was tied for 7th place after the first day but dropped into a tie for 20th after a disappointing second day.

Tournament wins
1929 Scottish Professional Championship
1930 Scottish Professional Championship

Results in major championships

Note: McCulloch only played in The Open Championship.

CUT = missed the half-way cut
"T" indicates a tie for a place

Team appearances
England–Scotland Professional Match (representing Scotland): 1932, 1933, 1934, 1935, 1936, 1937
Ireland–Scotland Professional Match (representing Scotland): 1932 (tie), 1933, 1934, 1935

References

Scottish male golfers
Sportspeople from South Ayrshire
People from Troon
1893 births
1968 deaths